VitrA is a Turkish manufacturer of sanitaryware, bathroom furniture, brassware and ceramic tiles. It is part of the Eczacıbaşı Group, a multinational corporation involved in building materials and consumer products.

History

1942–1999 
VitrA was founded in 1942 by Nejat Eczacıbaşı, the same year its first factory was built in Kartal, Turkey.

After the war, the company started growing rapidly. Its core products at the time were ceramic plumbing fixtures. This represented an innovation in the Turkish market, dominated by marble. The ceramic novelty brought to an immediate success, so much so that in 1958 the company changed sectors from tile manufacturing to sanitaryware to meet the increasing demand.

In 1966 the VitrA brand name was adopted. In 1977 production was started in Bozüyük, in 1979 an armature factory, in 1991 a bathroom furniture factory, and in 1992 a ceramic factory was built.

The early 1980s saw the company begin to exports its products, initially to Germany, where it opened its first foreign branch. In 1999 VitrA acquired a tile factory in Ireland, 5 years after the acquisition of the tile factory a new one was built.

2000s–present 
In 2002, Vitra changed its logo after 11 years, to try to make the company a world brand. In 2006, the company changed its logo again; the new logo was introduced at the UNICERA Ceramic and Bathroom Fair in Istanbul.

In 2011, VitrA started its production branch in Russia by building a factory in Serpukhov, Moscow, which cost about 30 million Euros. In 2019, the company opened its first branch in Italy.

In March 2020, the company won the 2020 iF Design Award in the awards' 66th year. In 2021, VitrA was awarded the TPM Excellence Award by the JIPM (Japanese Institute of Plant Maintenance). 

Ferit Erin, who joined the Eczacıbaşı Group in 2009, started as the general manager of Vitra on July 1, 2018.

Sponsorships 
From 2010 to 2021, Vitra sponsored Turkish women's volleyball team Eczacıbaşı. Vitra is also the sponsor of the International Hotel Awards for the Asia Pacific region and the Istanbul Festival of Architecture.

Manufacturing companies established in 1942
Privately held companies
Turkish brands
Manufacturing companies based in Istanbul
Eczacıbaşı family
1942 establishments in Turkey

References